Rear Admiral Hennie Bester is a retired South African Navy officer who served as Flag Officer Fleet from 2005 to 2008, when he retired.

Military career

He joined the Navy in 1968. He served on a number of ships before joining the project to acquire Strike Craft in 1976, serving as weapons and operations officer from 1978 to 1979 before being appointed Squadron planning officer in 1980. From February 1981 to December 1982 he commanded the SAS Frans Erasmus. He serves as Squadron Commander from 1987 to 1988 before being promoted Captain in November 1988 and appointed Commanding officer of the Strike Craft Flotilla.

He was appointed Director Naval planning in 1994 and in 1998 he joined the Joint Operations Division as Director Force Employment and promoted to rear admiral (junior grade). He was appointed Director Maritime Warfare in February 2002 and promoted to rear admiral on 1 February 2005 and appointed Flag Officer Fleet.

Awards and decorations

References

South African admirals
Year of birth missing (living people)
Living people